The Swiss Rugby Federation) is the governing body for rugby union in Switzerland.

It currently runs the League A, League B, League C and League 1 national championships. The leading teams compete for the Swiss Cup in the League A, that for the 2012-2013 season is organized as follows :

 Grasshoppers Club Zürich 
 Hermance Région Rugby Club 
 Lausanne Université Club Rugby 
 Nyon Rugby Club 
 Stade Lausanne Rugby Club 
 Rugby Club Avusy 
 Rugby Club Genève Plan-les-Ouates 
 UMB Rugby Lugano

See also
Switzerland national rugby union team
Nyon Rugby Club
Rugby Club CERN

References

External links
  Fédération Suisse de Rugby - official site

Rugby union in Switzerland
Rugby union governing bodies in Europe
Rugby
Organisations based in Bern
Sports organizations established in 1972